Stirling North is one of the seven wards used to elect members of the Stirling Council. Originally known as Castle from its creation in 2007, it returned three councillors and covered northern parts of the small city of Stirling, including Causewayhead, Cornton, Raploch and the town centre, as well as Stirling Castle from which the name derived. A 2017 national boundary review saw the ward become larger; this new territory consisted largely of an uninhabited area on the western slopes of the Ochil Hills and a rural area south of Blairlogie, but also incorporating the Cambuskenneth and Riverside neighbourhoods, with an increase in the electorate and an additional seat. It was also re-named at that time to the more descriptive Stirling North title. In 2019, the ward had a population of 16,476.

Councillors

Election results

2017 election
2017 Stirling Council election

2012 election
2012 Stirling Council election

2007 election
2007 Stirling Council election

References

Wards of Stirling
Stirling (city)